Eyrich is a surname. Notable people with the surname include:

 George Eyrich (1925–2006), American Major League Baseball player
 Lou Eyrich, American fashion designer
 Theodor Eyrich (1893–1979), Danish rower